The Lupul is a right tributary of the river Tazlău in Romania. It flows into the Tazlău in Poiana.

References

Rivers of Romania
Rivers of Bacău County